Manqoba Mngqithi (born 25 April 1971 in Umzimkhulu) is a South African football coach who is the "senior coach" of Mamelodi Sundowns. He has managed a number of clubs in the Premier Soccer League.Manqoba Mqithi is considered as one of the best coaches in South Africa.
He has been a coach for more than 15 years and is a former schoolteacher by profession.

In 2020 Mngqithi became co-coach of Mamelodi Sundowns alongside Rulani Mokwena. In October 2022, "Mngqithi was assigned to a new role as Sundowns' senior coach in what is a demotion from the position of co-coach. He will now be working under new head coach Rhulani Mokwena", Goal.com reported.

Personal life
Isibaya actress Asavela Mngqithi is Manqoba Mngqithi's daughter.

Honours
Mamelodi Sundowns
Premier Soccer League: 2021
MMTN8: 2009, 2021.

References

1971 births
Living people
People from Umzimkhulu Local Municipality
Zulu people
South African schoolteachers
South African soccer managers
Premier Soccer League managers
Lamontville Golden Arrows F.C. managers
AmaZulu F.C. managers
Chippa United F.C. managers
Mamelodi Sundowns F.C. managers